Adam Caporn (born 16 March 1982) is an Australian basketball coach and former player. He is the assistant coach for the Brooklyn Nets of the National Basketball Association (NBA). He is a former assistant coach at Saint Mary's College of California, where he also played college basketball. Born in Baldivis, Western Australia, he spent six seasons in the National Basketball League, three with the Wollongong Hawks and three for the Perth Wildcats.

Playing career
In 2000 and 2001, Caporn played basketball for at the Australian Institute of Sport (AIS) before heading to the United States to play college basketball for Saint Mary's College of California. After spending two seasons in the US, Caporn returned to Australia to play for the Wollongong Hawks in the Australian NBL.

After three years with the Hawks, Caporn returned to Western Australia to play for the Perth Wildcats.  Unfortunately in December, 2006, during his first season with the Wildcats, Caporn suffered a knee injury that required surgery.  After the surgery he was ruled out for the remainder of the season and was replaced in the line-up by Damien Ryan.  On 26 April 2007, the Wildcats announced the re-signing of Caporn to a new two-year deal.

Coaching career
While still playing with the Wildcats, he began serving as a part-time assistant with the Willetton Tigers in the State Basketball League in 2007. He assumed his first head coaching job two years later with another State League team, the East Perth Eagles. Caporn then moved on to AIS as Scholarship Coach, responsible for evaluation of prospective players and player development. In the northern hemisphere summer of 2010, he returned to Saint Mary's as an assistant.

In 2021, Caporn was named the head coach of the Long Island Nets of the NBA G League, the development team for the Brooklyn Nets. On 6 July 2022, he was named assistant coach for the Brooklyn Nets.

Personal life
He is married to Marcia Wallis, two-sport All American at Stanford (Soccer and Golf), and former professional player. They have a daughter Josette Anne Caporn.

References

External links
 Saint Mary's coaching bio

1982 births
Living people
Australian men's basketball coaches
Australian men's basketball players
Australian expatriate basketball people in the United States
Australian Institute of Sport basketball players
Perth Wildcats players
Point guards
Saint Mary's Gaels men's basketball coaches
Saint Mary's Gaels men's basketball players
Illawarra Hawks players